Sanja Maletić (born 27 April 1973) is a Bosnian-born Serbian pop-folk singer.

Music career
Sanja began her music career in the end of 1998.

Personal life
Maletić was born into an ethnic Serb family in Tuzla, SR Bosnia and Herzegovina, Yugoslavia.  Her father died in April 2012. She said of herself "I am a real Bosnian, loving strong and high-calorie food" and that her vice is "cigarettes and a good book"; her favourite book being Meša Selimović's Death and the Dervish.

She has apartments in Belgrade, Serbia and her hometown Tuzla.

Discography
Kani suzo (1998)
Snegovi  (2001)
Ruzmarin (2002)
Amajlija (2004)
Noć u mojoj sobi (2006)
Golden Girl (2010)

References

External links
discography at Discogs

1973 births
Living people
Bosnia and Herzegovina folk-pop singers
21st-century Serbian women singers
21st-century Bosnia and Herzegovina women singers
Serbs of Bosnia and Herzegovina
Musicians from Tuzla
Grand Production artists
BN Music artists